The 1976 South Carolina Gamecocks football team represented the University of South Carolina as an independent during the 1976 NCAA Division I football season. Led by second-year head coach Jim Carlen, the Gamecocks compiled a record of 6–5.

Schedule

Roster

Team players in the NFL

References

South Carolina
South Carolina Gamecocks football seasons
South Carolina Gamecocks football